Boreas is an oil painting in the Pre-Raphaelite style created in 1903 by John William Waterhouse.

Subject
The painting is titled Boreas, after the Greek god of the north wind and it shows a young girl buffeted by the wind. The 1904 Royal Academy notes described the subject of the painting as:

Provenance
Boreas was put up for sale in the mid-1990s after having been lost for 90 years – causing quite a sensation in the art community. The painting achieved a record price for Waterhouse at that time, achieving a price of £848,500 ($1,294,000 USD).

References

1903 paintings
Paintings by John William Waterhouse